The Tennessee Medical Association (TMA) is a professional organization for Doctors of Medicine (M.D.) and Doctors of Osteopathic Medicine (D.O.) in Tennessee.  The group predates the national association of which it is a part, the American Medical Association, by well over a decade.

History
Felix Robertson was a charter member of the TMA and president of the "Medical Society of Tennessee" (original name) in 1834–1840 and 1853–1855.

Projects
The TMA organizes an annual conference and publishes a journal, Tennessee Medicine.

People
In May 2013 Christopher E. Young became the 159th president of the TMA.

References

Further reading

External links

Entry in the Tennessee Encyclopedia

Healthcare in Tennessee
American Medical Association